Epiphragmophorinae is a subfamily of air-breathing land snails, terrestrial pulmonate gastropod mollusks in the family Xanthonychidae  (according to the taxonomy of the Gastropoda by Bouchet & Rocroi, 2005). This family has no subfamilies.

Shileyko (2004) listed 40 species within Epiphragmophorinae. There are about 65 recognized species within Epiphragmophorinae in 2017.

Anatomy
This family is defined by the absence of a diverticulum. These snails have one dart apparatus with a stylophore (dart sac), and one or two mucus glands that are inserted on the dart sac and on the accessory sac, or at the base of the dart sac.

Genera 
Genera within the family Epiphragmophorinae include:
 Angrandiella Ancey, 1886
 Dinotropis Pilsbry & Cockerell, 1937
 Doeringina Ihering, 1929
 Epiphragmophora Doering, 1874 - the type genus of the family Epiphragmophoridae. It occurs from Argentina to Bolivia.
 Minaselates Cuezzo & Pena, 2017 - with the only species Minaselates paradoxa Cuezzo & Pena, 2017
 Pilsbrya Ancey, 1887 - synonym: Poecilostola Ancey 1886

References

Further reading

External links

Xanthonychidae